Gustaf Lyman (25 August 1880 – 13 August 1969) was a Swedish sports shooter. He competed in two events at the 1912 Summer Olympics.

References

External links
 

1880 births
1969 deaths
Swedish male sport shooters
Olympic shooters of Sweden
Shooters at the 1912 Summer Olympics
People from Sundsvall
Sportspeople from Västernorrland County